Attorney General Adams may refer to:

Charles J. Adams (Vermont politician) (1917–2008), Attorney General of Vermont
Paul L. Adams (Michigan judge) (1908–1990), Attorney General of Michigan
William Henry Adams (1809–1865), Attorney General of Hong Kong

See also
General Adams (disambiguation)